Roland Hampe (2 December 1908 - 23 January 1981) was a German classical archaeologist.  From 1959-1975 he was a professor at Heidelberg University.  He was the son of  German historian Karl Hampe (1869-1936). He was elected to the American Philosophical Society in 1979.

References

1908 births
Classical archaeologists
Academic staff of Heidelberg University
1981 deaths

Members of the American Philosophical Society